Sérgio Batista is a Portuguese motorcycle racer. He has competed in the European Superstock 600 Championship and the FIM Superstock 1000 Cup

Grand Prix motorcycle racing

By season

Races by year
(key)

References

External links
 http://www.motogp.com/en/riders/Sergio+Batista
 http://www.worldsbk.com/en/rider/sergio+batista

Living people
Portuguese motorcycle racers
250cc World Championship riders
1992 births
People from Vila Nova de Famalicão
Sportspeople from Braga District